Bear Ye One Another's Burdens may refer to:
 the theme of a World prayer day 1935
 Bear Ye One Another's Burden, an East German drama film of 1988